Zhenzhou (真州镇) is a town in Yizheng, Jiangsu, China. 

Township-level divisions of Jiangsu
Yizheng